Roko Karanušić was the defending champion, but he chose to not participate this year.
Viktor Troicki won in the final 6–4, 6–2, against Dominik Hrbatý.

Seeds

Draw

Final four

Top half

Bottom half

Sources
 Main Draw

External links
 Qualifying Draw

GEMAX Open
GEMAX Open - Singles